4-Hydroxyphenylpyruvate dioxygenase (HPPD), also known as α-ketoisocaproate dioxygenase (KIC dioxygenase), is an Fe(II)-containing non-heme oxygenase that catalyzes the second reaction in the catabolism of tyrosine - the conversion of 4-hydroxyphenylpyruvate into homogentisate. HPPD also catalyzes the conversion of phenylpyruvate to 2-hydroxyphenylacetate and the conversion of α-ketoisocaproate to β-hydroxy β-methylbutyrate. HPPD is an enzyme that is found in nearly all aerobic forms of life.

Enzyme mechanism
HPPD is categorized within a class of oxygenase enzymes that usually utilize α-ketoglutarate and diatomic oxygen to oxygenate or oxidize a target molecule. However, HPPD differs from most molecules in this class due to the fact that it does not use α-ketoglutarate, and it only utilizes two substrates while adding both atoms of diatomic oxygen into the product, homogentisate. The HPPD reaction occurs through a NIH shift and involves the oxidative decarboxylation of an α-oxo acid as well as aromatic ring hydroxylation. The NIH-shift, which has been demonstrated through isotope-labeling studies, involves migration of an alkyl group to form a more stable carbocation. The shift, accounts for the observation that C3 is bonded to C4 in 4-hydroxyphenylpyruvate but to C5 in homogentisate. The predicted mechanism of HPPD can be seen in the following figure:

Structure 
HPPD is an enzyme that usually bonds to form tetramers in bacteria and dimers in eukaryotes and has a subunit mass of 40-50 kDa. Dividing the enzyme into the N-terminus and C-terminus one will notice that the N-terminus varies in composition while the C-terminus remains relatively constant (the C-terminus in plants does differ slightly from the C-terminus in other beings). In 1999 the first X-ray crystallography structure of HPPD was created and since then it has been discovered that the active site of HPPD is composed entirely of residues near the C-terminus of the enzyme. The active site of HPPD has not been completely mapped, but it is known that the site consists of an iron ion surrounded by amino acids extending inward from beta sheets (with the exception of the C-terminal helix). While even less is known about the function of the N-terminus of the enzyme, scientists have discovered that a single amino acid change in the N-terminal region can cause the disease known as hawkinsinuria.

Function 
In nearly all aerobic beings, 4-hydroxyphenylpyruvate dioxygenase is responsible for converting 4-hydroxyphenylpyruvate into homogentisate. This conversion is one of many steps in breaking L-tyrosine into acetoacetate and fumarate. While the overall products of this cycle are used to create energy, plants and higher order eukaryotes utilize HPPD for a much more important reason. In eukaryotes, HPPD is used to regulate blood tyrosine levels, and plants utilize this enzyme to help produce the cofactors plastoquinone and tocopherol which are essential for the plant to survive.

Disease relevance 
HPPD can be linked to one of the oldest known inherited metabolic disorders known as alkaptonuria, which is caused by high levels of homogentisate in the blood stream. HPPD is also directly linked to Type III tyrosinemia When the active HPPD enzyme concentration is low in the human body, it results in high levels of tyrosine concentration in the blood, which can cause mild mental retardation at birth, and degradation in vision as a patient grows older.

In Type I tyrosinemia, a different enzyme, fumarylacetoacetate hydrolase is mutated and doesn't work, leading to very harmful products building up in the body. Fumarylacetoacetate hydrolase acts on tyrosine after HPPD does, so scientists working on making herbicides in the class of HPPD inhibitors hypothesized that inhibiting HPPD and controlling tyrosine in the diet could treat this disease.  A series of small clinical trials were attempted with one of their compounds, nitisinone were conducted and were successful, leading to nitisinone being brought to market as an orphan drug.

Industrial relevance 
Due to HPPD’s role in producing necessary cofactors in plants, there are several marketed HPPD inhibitor herbicides that block activity of this enzyme, and research underway to find new ones.

References

Further reading 

 
 
 

EC 1.13.11